Maryam Rajavi is a leader of the People's Mujahedin of Iran (MEK), an organization advocating for the overthrow of the Iranian government, and president-elect of its National Council of Resistance of Iran (NCRI). She is married to Massoud Rajavi, who is the co-leader of MEK.

Early life and education
Rajavi was born Maryam Qajar-Azodanlu on 4 December 1953 in Tehran, Iran. She was raised in a middle-class family of civil servants descended from a member of the Qajar dynasty. She attended the Sharif University of Technology in Iran, earning a Bachelor of Science degree in metallurgy.

Political career
 

Rajavi has stated that her political activism began when she was twenty-two after her sister Narges was killed by SAVAK. Her other sister, Massumeh, was also executed (while pregnant) in 1982 by Ruhollah Khomeini’s regime. Then she became a member of the People's Mojahedin of Iran (PMOI/MEK), and began her political career. Rajavi served as deputy commander and MEK Secretary General until 1993. On 22 October 1993, the NCRI elected Rajavi to be "Iran’s interim President" if the NCRI were to assume power in Iran.

Rajavi served as an organizer of the anti-Shah student movement in the 1970s. In 1979, she became an official of the social section of the PMOI/MEK, where she served until 1981. Rajavi was a parliamentary candidate in 1980. 

In 1982, Rajavi was transferred to Auvers-sur-Oise, Île-de-France where the political headquarters of the Mojahedin was located.

In 1985, she became Joint-Leader of the PMOI and served as the Secretary General between 1989 and 1993.

In a statement that condemned the ISIS attacks against Iran's parliament and the tomb of the Islamic Republic's founder, Rajavi stated: "ISIS's conduct clearly benefits the Iranian regime's Supreme Leader Khamenei, who wholeheartedly welcomes it as an opportunity to overcome his regime's regional and international impasse and isolation. The founder and the number one state sponsor of terror is thus trying to switch the place of murderer and the victim and portray the central banker of terrorism as a victim."

In October 2011, Theresa May banned Rajavi from coming to Britain in a trip where she was to "explain how women are mistreated in Iran". The high court then sued Theresa May, with Lord Carlile of Berriew (the Government's former independent reviewer of counter-terrorism laws) saying that May's decision "could be viewed as appeasing the Mullahs". In 2014, the Supreme Court of the United Kingdom dismissed an appeal from Lord Carlile of Berriew QC and others and upheld it to maintain the ban, which had originally being implemented in 1997. Members of the UK House of Lords argued that the Home Secretary was "violating Article 10 (freedom of expression) of the European Convention of Human Rights (the Convention)", saying that "Home Secretary’s reasons were legally irrelevant, because they depended on the potential reaction of a foreign state which did not share the values embodied in the Convention." Rajavi is not excluded from any other European country and engages regularly with parliamentarians in the European Parliament.

Maryam Rajavi publicly met with the President of the State of Palestine Mahmoud Abbas on 30 July 2016 in Paris, France.

Electoral history

Activism  

In 1992, following the EP Council supported Maryam Rajavi’s advocacy for "the international community act specially in favor of women’s rights" following condemnation of human rights violations by the Iranian government.

Rajavi presented her plan at the Council of Europe in 2006, which supports complete gender equality in political and social rights and, specifically, a commitment to equal participation of women in political leadership. Her 10-point plan for the future of Iran stipulates that any form of discrimination against women would be abolished and that women would enjoy the right to choose their clothing freely. It also includes the ending of cruel and degrading punishments.

In April 2021, Maryam Rajavi endorsed resolution HR 118, which expresses “support for Iranian people’s desire for a democratic republic” and “condemns ‘violations of human rights and state-sponsored terrorism’ by Tehran”.

In July 2021, Rajavi organized a protest in Berlin to protest the election of Ebrahim Raisi as President of Iran. Rajavi called Raisi the "henchman" of the massacre of 30,000 political prisoners in 1988. She was joined in the protest by former U.S. Secretary of State Mike Pompeo, who expressed his support for Rajavi and the National Council of Resistance of Iran.

A 10-point manifesto published by Rajavi sets out a programme to transform Iran. She states her commitment to the Universal Declaration of Human Rights and to other international instruments. She calls for the abolition of the death penalty, the creation of a modern legal system and the independence of judges. Rajavi would end Tehran's funding of Hamas, Hezbollah and other militant groups and is committed to peaceful coexistence, relations with all countries and respect for the Charter of the United Nations. The manifesto also contains the statement that "We recognize private property, private investment and the market economy." In June 2020, a majority of members of the USA's House of Representatives backed a "bipartisan resolution" supporting Rajavi and the NCRI's "call for a secular, democratic Iran" while "condemning Iranian state-sponsored terrorism." The resolution, backed by 221 lawmakers (including Louie Gohmert and Sheila Jackson Lee), gave support to Rajavi's 10-point plan for Iran's future (which include "a universal right to vote, market economy, and a non-nuclear Iran") while calling on the prevention of "malign activities of the Iranian regime’s diplomatic missions."

2018 Rally incident 

In 2018, Vienna-based Iranian diplomat Asadollah Asadi was tried and sentenced to 20 years in prison in a high-profile case for masterminding a terrorism plot against a rally led by Maryam Rajavi. The rally was also attended by civilians and high-profile Westerners scheduled to speak (including Rudy Giuliani, Stephen Harper, and Bill Richardson).

Legal issues

France
On 17 June 2003, Rajavi was arrested by Paris Police Prefecture alongside some 150 MEK members. She and 23 other people were investigated over suspicion of links to terrorism. All charges were later dropped.

Iraq
In July 2010, the Iraqi High Tribunal issued an arrest warrant for 39 MEK members, including Rajavi, "due to evidence that confirms they committed crimes against humanity" by "involvement with the former Iraqi security forces in suppressing the 1991 uprising against the former Iraqi regime and the killing of Iraqi citizens". The MEK have denied the charges, saying that they constitute a "politically motivated decision and it’s the last gift presented from the government of Nuri al-Maliki to the Iranian government".

Books 

 Great March towards Freedom
 No to Compulsory Religion, No to Compulsory Government Illustrated
 Women, Islam and Fundamentalism
 Iran Will Be Free
 Key to Countering Islamic Fundamentalism

See also 

List of Iranian women
List of people from Tehran 
France–Iran relations

References

Notes

Citations

External links

1953 births
Living people
People from Tehran
Sharif University of Technology alumni
21st-century Iranian women politicians
21st-century Iranian politicians
Iranian emigrants to France
Fugitives wanted by Iraq
National Council of Resistance of Iran members
Fugitives wanted on crimes against humanity charges
People's Mojahedin Organization of Iran politicians
20th-century Iranian women politicians
20th-century Iranian politicians